Aaron Wilmer (born July 4, 1992) is an American football quarterback who is currently a free agent. He attended Delaware Valley University.

Early life
Wilmer played high school football and baseball at George Washington High School, where he was a first team All-League player as a junior and senior.

College career
Wilmer started his collegiate career at West Chester University where he red-shirted as a freshman. From 2011 to 2014, he played for the Aggies at Delaware Valley University. Wilmer started all four of his collegiate seasons at Delaware Valley University where he was a four-time All-Middle Atlantic Conference (MAC) and posted a 34-9 record as a starter. He also led the Aggies to a MAC Championship in 2011 and two trips to the NCAA Division III Playoffs (2011 and 2014).

Wilmer finished his career ranked second in school history in completions (692), passing yards (10,157), passing touchdowns (84), and total offense (11,795 yards) becoming just one of 26 QB's (at any NCAA level) to reach the 10,000-1,000 passing-rushing career yardage plateaus. During his senior season in 2014, he completed 185-of-316 pass attempts for 3,228 yards and 30 touchdowns while adding 310 rushing yards and seven scores on the ground. Wilmer was teammate of current Carolina Panthers wide receiver Rasheed Bailey.

College career statistics

Professional career
After his collegiate career, Wilmer signed with MRM Agent Marty Magid, who also represented Elvis Dumervil. Wilmer worked out with the Philadelphia Eagles and competed in the NFL Regional Combine. He spent time with the Canadian Football League's BC Lions and the Calgary Stampeders.

On October 25, 2016, Wilmer signed with the Spokane Empire of the Indoor Football League.

Personal life 
Wilmer is the son of Thomas and Dontissa Wilmer and he has one daughter, Giovana.
As well as two older brothers, Thomas and Damien.

References

External links 
 Aaron Wilmer articles on CBS Local

Living people
1992 births
American football quarterbacks
Canadian football quarterbacks
American players of Canadian football
Delaware Valley Aggies football players
Spokane Empire players
BC Lions players
Calgary Stampeders players